Rhinella rubropunctata (common name: red-spotted toad) is a species of toad in the family Bufonidae that is found in southern Chile and Argentina. Its natural habitats are humid to xeric temperate forests and open environments. It tolerates a certain degree of disturbance. Breeding takes place in shallow temporary ponds near rivers, reservoirs and lakes. It is threatened by habitat degradation and fragmentation.

References

rubropunctata
Amphibians described in 1848
Amphibians of Argentina
Amphibians of Chile
Taxonomy articles created by Polbot